The Orchards is a neighborhood in the North District of Baltimore, located between the neighborhoods of New North Roland Park–Poplar Hill and Bellona–Gittings. Its boundaries are marked by the Baltimore County line (north), Maryland Route 133 Northern Parkway (south), and Maryland Route 139 Charles Street (east). Roland Avenue, West Lake Avenue, Kenmore Road and Melrose Avenue draw the neighborhood's west boundary.

Landmarks
The Elkridge Hunt Club, a 117 acre 18 hole golf course, overlaps the city line at the northern edge of the Orchards, extending south to Lake Avenue along Charles Street. Established in 1878, it was originally a fox-hunting club.

Public transportation
Route 44 (MTA Maryland) provides bus service along Northern Parkway, along the southern edge of the Orchards. Route 61 (MTA Maryland) runs along Roland Avenue, from Lake Avenue (north) into the downtown area (south).

See also
Baltimore neighborhoods

References

External links 
North District Maps, Baltimore City Neighborhoods Portal

Neighborhoods in Baltimore
Northern Baltimore